The Firefox logo depicts an orange fox partially surrounding and overlooking the Earth.

While the initial design of the logo depicted a phoenix, it was changed to depict a fox after the name of the web browser was changed from Phoenix to Firefox. This logo was updated three times: in 2009, in 2013, and in 2017. Over the course of these redesigns, the logo transitioned to a more flat and textureless version.

In 2018, Firefox's developer Mozilla announced their intention to redesign the logo to accompany a series of logos, each representing a different product under the Firefox brand. After gathering feedback, the two proposed sets of logos were developed into a singular set, which was implemented in October 2019. The new set of logos also introduced a unifying logo to represent the brand as a whole, which was widely mistaken for the logo of the browser itself.

Several variations of Firefox have differing logos, such as Firefox Nightly, whose logo featured the globe from the base Firefox logo. In 2017, however, its logo was switched to an alternate color scheme of the base Firefox logo, changing the fox from red-orange to blue-purple, and darkening the globe.

History

Early history (2004–2017) 

The initial concept for the logo of Firefox depicted a phoenix rather than a fox, in line with the browser's name during early development, when it was known as Phoenix and Firebird rather than Firefox. 

After the name of the browser was decided to be Firefox, a team of 10 to 15 graphic designers within Mozilla began working on its logo. The first logo for the Firefox web browser came alongside the browser's first release in 2004, designed by John Hicks.

Mozilla revealed a new Firefox logo in June 2013, featuring less detailed textures than previous incarnations on both the globe and the fox.

The Firefox logo was also redesigned in 2017, as a part of an effort to combat Firefox's waning market share in the web browser market.

Transition to overarching identity and simplicity (2018–present) 

In 2018, Mozilla began an internal design project that aimed to create a new Firefox brand. The project consisted of three teams, each with a separate design theme, being "fire", "fox", and "free". That July, Mozilla revealed proposals to create a new series of logos for Firefox, saying that "as an icon, that fast fox with a flaming tail doesn’t offer enough design tools to represent this entire product family",⁣ and that they intended to design the family of logos with a blank slate, rather than tweaking previous designs. The proposals consisted of two "design systems", each with both a series of logos for individual Firefox products, and a singular logo to represent the brand as a whole. The brand logo in the first design system was a stylized, geometric fox head, while the brand logo in the second design system was a simplistic, circular flame.

On June 11, 2019, a new logo for the web browser was announced. The 2019 logo was more simple and stylized compared to the previous logos, and was closer in appearance to the first design system presented in 2018, though the system of logos as a whole was closer to the second system. In the 2019 redesign, the Earth was changed from blue to purple, and the design of the fox was further simplified, with its legs being removed completely. Additionally, the browser logo aimed to become more abstract in order to make the logo "fit visually with everything else" in the Firefox brand. The brand logo depicts a swirl of fire inspired by the circular motion of the spinning browser icon, as during the development, the team "got a very clear signal that we didn't actually have to show a fox for people to know that it was Firefox". Alongside the redesigned browser logo and brand logo, logos were introduced for Firefox Send, Firefox Monitor, and Firefox Lockwise. The logos for Firefox Monitor and Firefox Lockwise were unveiled in May 2019, marking the first of the redesigned Firefox logos to be announced. The new logos for the Firefox brand, the Firefox Browser, Firefox Send, Firefox Monitor, and Firefox Lockwise were implemented in Firefox 70 on October 22, 2019.

Design 
The logo for the Firefox web browser depicts a stylized fox. The fox is seen either overlooking (in the logos from 2004 to 2019) or surrounding it (in the 2019 logo).

Variants 
Firefox Nightly, an alternative version to Firefox that allows for features to be tested before their public implementation, has a differing logo to the base Firefox web browser.

In 2017, Mozilla introduced a new logo for Firefox Nightly. The logo preceded the 2017 redesign of the base Firefox logo, introducing the more "flat" and textureless design. It changed the color of the fox from a red-orange to a blue-purple, as well as darkening the planet.

In August 2019, Mozilla updated the logo to match that of the 2019 Firefox brand redesign, while keeping the alternative color scheme.

Reception 

Sean Hollister of The Verge likened the 2019 redesign to "a world on fire", saying it was something "many of us can easily identify with these days", and saying that he believes the logo will "grow on [him]".

After the 2019 logo change, many mistook the logo for the Firefox family of products as a whole for the logo of the Firefox web browser. In February 2021, several internet memes circulated surrounding the removal of the fox in the redesigned logos. However, this was due to confusion between the overarching brand logo and the logo for the web browser itself.

References 

Firefox
Mozilla
Commercial logos